Ming Prefecture, also known by its Chinese name Mingzhou, was a prefecture (zhou) of imperial China in present-day Hebei Province. It existed intermittently from AD578 to 1278. Its seat—also known at the time as Mingzhou—was at Guangfu in Handan's Yongnian District.

Geography
The administrative region of Ming Prefecture in the Tang dynasty is under the administration of modern Handan in southern Hebei. It probably includes parts of modern: 
Handan
Handan County
Qiu County
Feixiang County
Wu'an City
Jize County
Yongnian County
Quzhou County

References
 

Prefectures of the Sui dynasty
Prefectures of the Tang dynasty
Prefectures of the Song dynasty
Prefectures of the Jin dynasty (1115–1234)
Prefectures of Later Liang (Five Dynasties)
Prefectures of Later Han (Five Dynasties)
Prefectures of Later Jin (Five Dynasties)
Prefectures of Later Tang
Prefectures of Later Zhou
Former prefectures in Hebei